Naenara is the official web portal of the North Korean government. It was the first website in North Korea, and was created in 1996. The portal's categories include politics, tourism, music, foreign trade, arts, press, information technology, history, and "Korea is One".

The website carries publications such as The Pyongyang Times,  magazine, Korea Today magazine and Foreign Trade magazine along with Korean Central News Agency news.

South Korean users' access to the site has been blocked by South Korean authorities since 2011 and  the website remained blocked.

See also

Censorship in North Korea
Chollima (website)
Internet in North Korea
List of North Korean websites banned in South Korea
Red Star OS
Uriminzokkiri

References

External links

korea-dpr.com
North Korea's baby steps for the Internet at physorg.com

North Korean websites
Web portals